Pachytriton archospotus is a species of salamander in the family Salamandridae endemic to southern China. It is found in Hunan, Jiangxi, and Guangdong provinces.

References

archospotus